General elections were held in Peru on 9 April 1995, the first under the 1993 constitution. Incumbent President Alberto Fujimori was easily re-elected with 64.4% of the vote defeating former UN Secretary General Javier Pérez de Cuéllar, whilst his Cambio 90-New Majority alliance won a majority of seats in the newly unicameral Congress.

Results

President

Congress

References

Elections in Peru
Peru
1995 in Peru
Presidential elections in Peru